Alex Stapleton is an American director, showrunner, and executive producer of documentary feature films and unscripted television.

Career 
Stapleton's directorial debut was the 2011 feature documentary, Corman's World: Exploits of a Hollywood Rebel, about the life and career of film producer Roger Corman. Premiering at the 2011 Cannes Film Festival, it was in competition for the Caméra d'Or award. The documentary includes interviews with Jack Nicholson, Martin Scorsese, and Ron Howard among others. On review aggregator Rotten Tomatoes, Corman's World: Exploits of a Hollywood Rebel has an approval rating of 92% based on 51 reviews.

In 2019, Stapleton directed and executive produced the Netflix documentary Hello, Privilege. It's Me, Chelsea. The project follows Chelsea Handler as she reexamines the concept of white privilege and its affect on American culture.

For the 2020 Netflix docuseries, The Playbook, Stapleton directed an episode on legendary coach Jill Ellis about the rules she lives by to find success on and off the field.

Stapleton executive produced and showran the FX documentary television miniseries, Pride, which followed the fight for LGBT rights in the United States decade-by-decade from the 1950's through the 2000's. Produced by Killer Television, Vice Studios, and Refinery29, the 6 episode series premiered on May 14, 2021. On Rotten Tomatoes, Pride has an approval rating of 100% based on 12 reviews, with an average rating of 7.5/10. The series was nominated for several awards including a Gotham Independent Film Award and a GLAAD Media Award.

Later in 2021, Stapleton founded the production company House of NonFiction which has an overall deal with Industrial Media. House of NonFiction's overall will continue with Sony Pictures Television following the later's acquisition of Industrial Media in 2022.

Stapleton will direct the upcoming Reggie Jackson documentary currently titled Reggie with Delirio Films, BRON, and Red Crown Productions producing.

Filmography

Awards 

 2022- GLAAD Media Award Nominee, Pride (FX/Killer Films/Vice Studios)
 2021- Gotham Independent Film Award Nominee, Pride (FX/Killer Films/Vice Studios)
 2019- NAACP Image Award Nominee, Shut Up and Dribble (Showtime/Springhill Entertainment)
 2017- Emmy Award Winner, SoCal Connected (PBS/KCET)
 2011- Camera d'Or Award Nominee, Corman's World (A&E)

References

External links 
 
 Alex Stapleton at Rotten Tomatoes

Living people
American documentary film directors
American television producers
American documentary filmmakers
African-American film directors
American women documentary filmmakers
American women film directors
American women television producers
American women television directors
American television directors
Year of birth missing (living people)